A centered world, according to David Kellogg Lewis, consists of (1) a possible world, (2) an agent in that world, and (3) a time in that world.  The concept of centered worlds has epistemic as well as metaphysical uses; for the latter, the three components of a centered world have connections to theories such as actualism, solipsism (especially egocentric presentism and perspectival realism), and presentism, respectively.

References

Concepts in epistemology
Concepts in metaphysics
Metaphysics of mind
Philosophy of time
Possible worlds
Theory of mind